Kayaca can refer to:

 Kayaca, Manyas
 Kayaca, Tavas